Arieșeni is a commune located in Alba County, Transylvania, Romania. It has a population of 1,921. The commune is composed of eighteen villages: Arieșeni, Avrămești, Bubești, Casa de Piatră, Cobleș, Dealu Bajului, Fața Cristesei, Fața Lăpușului, Galbena, Hodobana, Izlaz, Păntești, Pătrăhăițești, Poienița, Ravicești, Ștei-Arieșeni, Sturu, and Vanvucești.

Geography
The commune is located in the ethnogeographical region Țara Moților, in the northwestern corner of Alba County, on the border with Bihor County. It is crossed by national road , which starts near Ștei,  to the west, and runs to Câmpeni (the capital of Țara Moților),  to the east, and on to Turda, where it joins DN1.

The river Arieșul Mare, which has its source in the nearby Mount Vârtopul, flows through Arieșeni.

Tourism
The first ski lift in Romania was installed in Arieșeni and with the opening of the new slope, the resort has also got a brand new funicular.

There are several other notable natural tourist sites in the area, including the Vârciorog Waterfall, the Scărișoara Glacier, Groapa Ruginoasă, Piatra Grăitoare, Pătrăhăițești village, and the Cucurbăta Mare, also known as the Bihor Peak.

References

Communes in Alba County
Localities in Transylvania
Ski areas and resorts in Romania